The 41st Telluride Film Festival took place on August 29–September 1, 2014, in Telluride, Colorado, United States.

Artists Guy Maddin and Kim Morgan were appointed as the year's guest directors. Telluride honored director Volker Schlöndorff, actress Hilary Swank and feature Apocalypse Now as the awardees of the Silver Medallion. Special Medallion was awarded to film archive Cineteca di Bologna and its head Gian Luca Farinelli. The festival line-up was announced on August 28, 2014.

Official selections

Main program

Guest Directors' Selections
The films were screened in archival 35 mm prints and selected by the year's guest directors Guy Maddin and Kim Morgan.

Filmmakers of Tomorrow

Student Prints
The selection was curated and introduced by Gregory Nava. It selected the best student-produced work around the world.

Calling Cards
The selection was curated by Jonathan Marlow. It selected new works from promising filmmakers.

Great Expectations
The selection was curated by Jonathan Marlow.

References

External links

41st Telluride Film Festival program guide

2014 film festivals
2014 in Colorado
41st